Nevalainen is a Finnish surname. Notable people with the surname include:

 Anders Nevalainen (1848–1933) Finnish-Russian Fabergé workmaster
 Esko Nevalainen (1925–2008), Finnish film cinematographer
 Frida Nevalainen (born 1987), Swedish ice hockey player
 Jukka Nevalainen (born 1978), Finnish symphonic metal drummer
 Lauri Nevalainen (1927–2005), Finnish rower
 Liisa Nevalainen (1916–1987), Finnish actress

References

Finnish-language surnames